Roy Fegan (born January 27, 1961, in Los Angeles, California) is an American actor, producer, director and president of 3inaRo Entertainment. He is best known for his role as Simon Caine in the 1993 film The Meteor Man.

Career 
Some of his other acting credits include the television series The Shield, Will & Grace, The Jamie Foxx Show, Matlock, Touched by an Angel, Martin, Married... with Children and Hangin' with Mr. Cooper. He also appeared in the video game Titanfall.

Fegan is writer and producer of hit musical Treat Her Like a Lady. Besides The Meteor Man, Fegan has worked numerous times with actor/director Robert Townsend, first in the film Hollywood Shuffle (1987), along with I'm Gonna Git You Sucka (1988), The Five Heartbeats (1991) and episodes on the HBO television series Partners in Crime.

Fegan guest-starred in the seventh episode of the second season of Scream Queens as Slade Hornborn, a reporter from the fictional Northeast Journal of Medicine.

Personal life 
He is the father of actor, producer, songwriter Roshon Fegan.

Filmography

Film

Television

References

External links

1961 births
Male actors from Los Angeles
African-American people
American male film actors
American male television actors
Living people
Film producers from California
American film directors
20th-century American male actors
20th-century African-American people